Viscount Inoue Kowashi  was a Japanese statesman of the Meiji period.

Biography

Early life 
Inoue was born into a samurai family in Higo Province (present-day Kumamoto Prefecture), as the third son of Karō Iida Gongobei. In 1866 Kowashi was adopted by Inoue Shigesaburō, another retainer of the Nagaoka daimyō. Known as a highly intelligent child, Inoue entered the domain's Confucian academy, eventually becoming one of the academy's resident students. He fought on the imperial side in the Boshin War to overthrow the Tokugawa bakufu.

After the Meiji Restoration, Inoue joined the Ministry of Justice, and was sent to Germany and France for studies. He became a protégé of Ōkubo Toshimichi, and accompanied him to Beijing (China) for negotiations with the Qing court following the Taiwan Expedition of 1874. After Ōkubo's assassination, he worked closely with Itō Hirobumi and Iwakura Tomomi, and became a member of the Genrōin.

Meiji bureaucrat 
In 1875, based upon his experiences in Europe, Inoue published two volumes of documents called  ("Constitutions for Kingdoms"), which was primarily a translation of the Prussian and Belgian constitutions with Inoue's own commentary, which he submitted to Iwakura Tomomi. Iwakura recognized Inoue's talent and assigned him to work on the project for drafting a new constitution for Japan. Working with German legal advisor Karl Friedrich Hermann Roesler, Inoue worked on the drafts of the Meiji Constitution, and also drafts of the Imperial Household Law.

In 1877 Inoue was appointed Chief Cabinet Secretary, in 1881 Chief Secretary to the House of Peers, in 1884 adjunct Chief Librarian of the Imperial Household Ministry, in 1888 Director General of the Cabinet Legislation Bureau.  Inoue became a member of the Privy Council in 1890, and served as Minister of Education in the second Itō administration from 1893. In 1895, he was ennobled with the title of shishaku (viscount) in the kazoku peerage system.

References and further reading 
 Khan, Yoshimitsu. Inoue Kowashi and the dual images of the Emperor of Japan, Pacific Affairs, Summer 1998.

1844 births
1895 deaths
Education ministers of Japan
Kazoku
Meiji Restoration
People from Kumamoto Prefecture
People of Meiji-period Japan